Kapro Industries Ltd is a global developer and manufacturer of hand tools for the professional and DIY markets. The company concentrates primarily on spirit levels, laser levels and layout and marking tools. Kapro is the registered trademark of Kapro Industries and its subsidiaries. The best known Kapro product is the Plumb Site vial viewer.

Basics 

Kapro is headquartered at Kibbutz Kadarim, with subsidiaries in the USA (Kapro Tools Inc.) and in China (Kapro China Ltd.) – all wholly owned and operated by Kapro Industries. The company is Israel's sole manufacturer of spirit levels.

History 

The company was founded in 1974 and renamed Kapro (Kadarim Products) in 1990. Kapro Holdings (owned by Kibbutz Kadarim and its members) is the company's majority shareholder. In 1995, Kapro adopted its signature red color, launched the Kapro brand and added laser levels to its range.

Research and development 

Kapro utilizes Systematic Inventive Thinking (S.I.T.) as a system for developing inventive ideas and products from within the company.

In 2004, Kapro's CEO Paul Steiner gave the "State of the Industry" address at the annual convention of The Specialty Tools and Fasteners Distributors Association, on the topic of Innovation.

Community and Charitable Projects 

In 2010, Kapro won an award from the Manufacturers Association of Israel for its contribution to the community. Kapro's projects include coordination of an educational clean-up project in the Zalmon Riverbed involving local school groups, and volunteer work at the Machanayim center for people with special intellectual needs.

References

External links 
 kapro.com

Manufacturing companies of Israel